The 2005 Asian Karate Championships are the 7th edition of the Asian Karate Championships, and were held in Macau, China from 19 to 22 May 2005.

Medalists

Men

Women

Medal table

References
 Results

External links
 AKF Official Website

Asian Championships
Asian Karate Championships
Asian Karate Championships
Karate Championships